The LV Strip is one of the designated Nevada Gaming Control Boards reporting areas.  It consists of the Las Vegas Strip casinos and many of the surrounding casinos. The Strip earns roughly 50% of the gaming revenue from all sources for the state of Nevada.

For the previous 12 months ending 31 August 2009, the Las Vegas Strip earns 83.6% of the pit revenue in Clark County, and 50.6% of the gaming revenue from other sources (slot machines, sports bet, parimutuel, etc.).

Penny slot machines is the only categories of gaming devices where revenue is increasing. After decades of being the top earning game in the pit, blackjack was surpassed by baccarat for the previous 12 months ending 31 August 2009. In August 2009, the game of baccarat was responsible for over 50% of the pit gaming revenue for the Strip which surpassed the game's contribution in February during Chinese New Year.

Since 1999, non-gaming revenue at the Strip casinos exceeds gaming revenue. In more traditional gaming areas like Downtown Las Vegas or Laughlin gaming is still the primary revenue source.

Gaming revenue of Strip casinos
Financial information is provided to show where the source of gaming revenue comes from (slots revenue, vs. pit revenue, etc.). Data is contrasted for the year ending October 2007 when revenue peaked. The other-pit category is all the other table games like Bingo, Keno, Let it Ride, Mini-Baccarat, Pai-Gow, Pai-Gow Poker, 3-Card Poker, Caribbean Stud, Sports Book, Racing Book, and so forth.

The year ending August 2009 is the first year that Baccarat has had higher revenue than Twenty One (or Blackjack). Although Baccarat is played in other areas of Nevada besides the Strip, 99.2% of the Baccarat revenue in the state is from the Strip.

 Aria Casino had not yet opened in FY09.

				
 Palazzo operated under the same license as the Venetian for this year.

 The Nevada Gaming Commission's definition of the LV Strip reporting area includes casinos surrounding the Strip.

 The gaming abstract as published only says there are 38 casinos that are in the Gaming Commission's definition of the Strip, the individual names of those casinos are not published since it is not permitted under state law.
  At least 9 of the 23 casinos currently on the over $72 million list existed before 1989. Some of the older casinos, like the Tropicana in previous years may have earned more than $72 million a year in gaming revenue, but have since dropped below that amount. The gaming commission does not adjust the $72 million from year to year.
 Outside of the Strip there are 22 licenses in the rest of the state of Nevada that earn more than $72 million per year apiece in gaming revenue. The casinos locations are: 1 in Lake Tahoe, 5 in Reno, 3 in Laughlin and 13 in other parts of the Las Vegas urban area such as downtown Las Vegas, Summerlin, North Las Vegas, Henderson and Paradise.

North Strip
The North Strip is the unofficial name of the first mile of Las Vegas Blvd. just outside the Las Vegas City Limits, corresponding to Winchester, Nevada. This section of the Strip currently includes five budget resorts, like the Sahara Hotel, Circus Circus Las Vegas, Slots-A-Fun Casino, the Riviera Hotel and Casino and the Greek Isles Hotel and Casino. Collectively they have less than 200 table games, 4200 slots, 31 poker tables and less than 8000 hotel rooms. Also numerous time shares have been built in this region.

The North Strip was planned to be rebuilt as an upscale gambling district comparable to center Strip. Billions of dollars were invested in land speculation. The former Stardust Resort & Casino and New Frontier Hotel and Casino were imploded in anticipation of new development.

Many new resorts Las Vegas Plaza, Crown Las Vegas, Echelon Place, an unnamed joint MGM & Kerzner project, and the Fontainebleau Resort Las Vegas planned for development, but all these projects are in various stages of bankruptcy or incomplete status. In addition a major redevelopment and expansion of the Sahara Hotel and Casino and the Stratosphere Las Vegas were put on hold.

The Triple Five Group was in the process of trying to assemble  of North Strip land just south of the Riviera Casino. By April 2008, they had acquired  at a cost of $380 million. They applied to the FAA for height clearance for eight 572' towers.

Another project announced was the construction of a Marriott Marquis on land currently occupied by a Residence Inn and a Courtyard Inn belonging to Marriott corporation.

The Fontainebleau Resort Las Vegas was the most visible failure as it topped out the tallest building in Las Vegas before going bankrupt. Initial offers for selling the uncompleted tower are far less than the raw land value from two years ago. The Echelon also got as far as erecting steel girders up as high as the eighth floor for several buildings. The owners, Boyd Gaming sold the property to the Malaysian company Genting. They plan on opening Resorts World Hotel and Casino in 2018. The style will be Chinese themed.

 Casino revenue in fiction 
In the movie Ocean's Thirteen, the lead character, Danny Ocean, is describing a new ultra-luxurious casino opening on the Strip. He states that the big casinos on the Strip take in $3 million a day just from the casino floor, and this new resort is aiming for $5 million. In reality, the two largest corporate operations in Las Vegas, MGM Mirage and Harrah's Entertainment, in the first quarter of 2009, brought in $5.9 million and $4.1 million per day, respectively, in gaming revenue alone, but this was from all their Las Vegas Strip resorts combined. MGM Mirage currently owns nine Strip resorts, and Harrah's owns eight with one being a minor property originally intended to be a tear-down. No single casino operation has ever brought in close to $3 million a day from the casino floor alone, and the NVGC uses the qualification of greater than $200,000 per day ($72 million per year) as a grouping for reporting purposes.

 Distribution of total revenue of Strip casinos high to low 
The Nevada Gaming Commission (NGC) publishes annual information about total revenue including gaming, hotel rooms, food & beverage, and attractions. If the casinos are numbered with #1 being the highest grossing casino then the following show the total revenue, for the period 1 July 2008 through 30 June 2009.

TOTAL REVENUE (GAMING + etc.)
 $759,063,730  is revenue for casino #6 
 $571,415,161 is average of  casino #10 and #11 
 $390,381,914 is revenue for casino #12 
 $266,022,372 is revenue for casino #18
 $246,291,317 is average of  casinos #20 and #21

The NGC does not publish data for individual casinos. But based on the size, age, and relative luxury of the casinos an analyst can guess the top six. 
 Venetian & Palazzo operated under one license 
 Wynn Casino (Encore had not opened yet)
 Caesars Palace
 Bellagio 
 MGM Grand Hotel 
 Mandalay Bay & THE Hotel operated under one license

Harrah's Entertainment Corporation only reports aggregate numbers for regions, but their flagship property, Caesar's Palace, is clearly the biggest moneymaker in their portfolio. Harrah's earns 54% of their revenue from the casinos, unlike MGM-Mirage which earns 38% of their revenue (before promotional allowances) from the casino floor.

Both companies are experiencing 20% drops for Calendar Year 2009 vs 2008. MGM-MIRAGE sold their Strip casino Treasure Island in 2009. The revenue from TI for a portion of 2009 is not included in the total. Revenue reported by MGM-Mirage for the year ending 31 December 2004 for top Las Vegas casinos owned at this time. Mandalay Bay, Luxor, Excalibur, Circus Circus, and Monte Carlo were acquired at a later date.

Change in revenue
The revenue for the Strip is contrasted with that of the state of Nevada. Gaming Revenue went flat for 3.5 years from July 2000 through January 2004, partly because of the downturn after 9/11. For the four years from January 2004 to January 2008 gaming revenue increased by a third. During this time, the only new casino to open on the Strip was Wynn Resort, and a new hotel tower opened on Mandalay Bay. Several dozen new casinos were planned. Finally, when the Palazzo casino opened in January 2008, gaming revenue was starting to fall. The Palazzo was followed by Palms Place, Trump Tower, Wynn Encore, The Cannery, The M Resort, and the yet to open MGM City Center and Fontainebleau. Also numerous new condominiums, and hotel towers were added to existing casinos.

In fiscal year 1990 (1 July 1989- 30 June 1990), the Commission reported a total of 13 casinos on the Strip that earned more than $72 million per year in gaming revenue. The first modern mega-resort, The Mirage, opened about halfway through this fiscal year and the Rio All Suite Hotel and Casino opened 8 weeks later. Presumably some of the casinos in this category have since been imploded in favor of newer resorts. At that time the average gaming revenue was $129.2 million per year and non-gaming revenue was $97.8 million  (for an average of $227 million total revenue). Non-Gaming revenue has since surpassed gaming revenue for the Las Vegas Strip.

In 2008 Cash sales of Food and Beverage come fairly close to covering the raw cost of sales, and the departmental expenses. In 1990 both food and beverage were sold at a loss. Complimentary food and beverage is shown as well (everything relative to the raw cost of sales).

In 1990 Room Sales only slightly exceeded departmental expenses and complimentary rooms. In 2008 room sales far exceed expenses and comps. Amounts are shown in millions of dollars. The statistics are contrasted with those of Downtown Las Vegas where cash sales are still not much higher than the departmental expenses plus the cost of the comped rooms.

 Hotel / casino development construction bulletin 
The Las Vegas Convention Center website posts a monthly update to the planned construction for the Las Vegas metropolitan area for the future. In the four years between 2003 and 2007 there was a cumulative addition of 1,444 rooms to Las Vegas. The major openings were Wynn Las Vegas and THE Hotel at Mandalay Bay, which were offset by the implosion of several resorts like New Frontier, The Stardust, Bourbon Street, and Castaways''. During the same four years visitor volume increased by 3.66 million or 10.3% and gaming revenue in Clark county increased by $3 billion or 38.8%. On many weekends there was insufficient room supply to meet demand. However, once the new rooms opened the recession hit.

Since so much was constructed in 2008 and 2009 there is very little planned for the near future.

Because the timeline is unknown the report omits the Fontainebleau Resort Las Vegas which is already topped out, but is currently in bankruptcy. Also the Echelon Place which is built as far as steel framing, but is on indefinite hold.

References 

Las Vegas Strip
Clark County, Nevada
Gambling in Nevada